The Pleasure Garden, is a 1961 Swedish comedy film directed by Alf Kjellin and written by Ingmar Bergman.

Cast
 Sickan Carlsson as Fanny, waitress
 Gunnar Björnstrand as David Samuel Franzén
 Bibi Andersson as Anna, Fanny's daughter
 Per Myrberg as Emil
 Kristina Adolphson as Astrid Skog, book store proprietor
 Stig Järrel as Ludvig Lundberg
 Hjördis Petterson as Ellen, David's sister
 Gösta Cederlund as Liljedahl

References

External links
 

1961 films
1961 comedy films
Swedish comedy films
1960s Swedish-language films
Films directed by Alf Kjellin
Films with screenplays by Ingmar Bergman
Films scored by Erik Nordgren
1960s Swedish films